Toni K. Choueiri is a Lebanese American medical oncologist and researcher. He is the Jerome and Nancy Kohlberg Professor of Medicine at Harvard Medical School and Director of the Lank Center for Genitourinary Oncology at the Dana–Farber Cancer Institute. His work has led to the establishment of several novel drugs (cabozantinib, avelumab, pazopanib and others including combinations) and prognostic factors in advanced renal cell carcinoma (RCC). Choueiri also co-established the International metastatic database Consortium with Daniel Heng. His biomarker work has shed light on complex immunogenomics mechanisms contributing to response and resistance to targeted therapy and immunotherapy.

Early life and education
Choueiri was born and raised in Beirut, Lebanon where he remained for his medical degree at Saint Joseph University's Faculty of Medicine. He trained at the Cleveland Clinic in Ohio after his medical school and moved in 2007 to the Dana–Farber Cancer Institute.

Career
Choueiri collaborated with Paul Nguyen in 2011 to perform a meta-analysis of randomized studies involving 4,141 prostate cancer patients to conclude whether men receiving ADT had a higher rate of cardiovascular deaths. The conclusion of the study found that there was no difference between those who received ADT compared with those who didn't but could not rule out that ADT might elevate the risk of fatal heart attacks. The following year, Choueiri found that three new cancer drugs were linked to a slightly elevated chance of fatal side effects. From 2015 and for the next several years, Choueiri led the development of cabozantinib in metastatic RCC from early phase 1 to randomized trials leading to its approval in TKI-refractory disease in 2016 and in untreated RCC patients in 2017. Choueiri also co-established the International metastatic database Consortium with Daniel Heng.

In 2017, Choueiri led a study which found that patients with metastatic papillary renal cell carcinoma benefited from savolitinib, a drug targeted to an abnormal genetic pathway causing cancerous growth. The following year, Choueiri was appointed Full professor of Medicine at Harvard Medical School and continued in his position as the Director of the Lank Center for Genitourinary Oncology. In this role, he led the development of the combination of axitinib+avelumab from phase I to late stage trials, leading to the combination being approved for RCC therapy in May 2019.

During the COVID-19 pandemic in North America, Choueiri completed shifts with the COVID-19 service team, treating oncology patients who have either been diagnosed COVID-19 positive, or who are suspected of being COVID-19 positive. In an effort to combat COVID, he co-lead a multinational study to identify risk factors unique to cancer patients. He also continued his research into kidney cancer and developed, with Matthew Freedman, one of the first liquid biopsy methods which could detect early stages of kidney cancers with high accuracy. The test was nearly 100 per cent accurate when used with blood samples to distinguish patients with kidney cancer from those without. Similarly, Choueiri also collaborated with William Kaelin Jr. in translational and clinical research, including recently around HIF2 inhibitors in clear-cell renal cancer, where he reported on activity and safety of MK-6482 in highly-refractory RCC patients. He also led the cabozantinib+nivolumab phase 3 study (Checkmate 9ER) that showed this regimen to be superior to sunitinib, which led to its FDA approval in January 2021. He also co-led with Robert Motzer the development of the combination of Lenvatinib+pembrolizumab which was FDA approved in August 2021. Later that year, Choueiri presented during the plenary session of the ASCO meeting the results of Checkmate-564 trial that showed for the first time that immunotherapy can be efficacious in the adjuvant setting in high-risk renal cancer, culminating in the FDA approval of pembrolizumab in RCC after surgery. As a result of his research, Choueiri was inducted in the 2021 Giants of Cancer Care class.

Personal life
Choueiri and his wife Sue have two children together and are soccer fans of the MLS, Bundesliga, and Premier League.

References

External links

CV

Living people
Lebanese medical researchers
American oncologists
Saint Joseph University alumni
Harvard Medical School faculty
Scientists from Beirut
Year of birth missing (living people)